When the Going Gets Tough may refer to:

 When the Going Gets Tough, the Tough Get Going, a popular English language proverb
 "When the Going Gets Tough, the Tough Get Going" (song), a 1985 song by Billy Ocean
 When the Going Gets Tough, the Tough Get Going (album), a 1983 album by Bow Wow Wow
 "When the Going Gets Tough" (Raven song), a 1985 song by Raven from Stay Hard
 When the Going Gets Tough (novel), a novel by Mel White